David Blitzer may refer to:

David M. Blitzer (born 1948), American economist
David S. Blitzer (born 1969), American business executive

See also

 
 David (disambiguation)
 Blitzer (disambiguation)